Stephen L. Norris is one of the co-founders of The Carlyle Group, an American private equity firm and previously the Chairman of Gulf Capital Partners. He is a former member of the Federal Retirement Thrift Investment Board, who was appointed by President George H. W. Bush and confirmed by the United States Senate in 1990. In July 2014, it was announced he had joined the Florida-based company Global Digital Solutions.

Corporate career
Carlyle was founded in 1987 by five Washington executives: William E. Conway, Jr., Stephen L. Norris, David M. Rubenstein, Daniel A. D'Aniello and Greg Rosenbaum. Rosenbaum left in 1987; Norris left in 1995. The three remaining founders are reported to collectively own around a 50% interest in the group's general partnership. The rest of Carlyle is owned by a group of individuals, most of whom serve as managing directors, and by two institutional investors. Prior to co-founding the Carlyle Group, Norris was a senior executive at Marriott Corporation.

In 2008, Norris announced a memorandum of understanding with the SCO Group, a Unix and Linux software company involved in lawsuits against IBM, Novell, and others. Under the terms of the plan, Norris would purchase a controlling interest in SCO for $100 million.

In March 2009, Gulf Capital Partners, LLC, announced the appointment of Norris as the chairman of the board of directors. Gulf Capital Partners is a private equity firm based in Beverly Hills, California with offices in Dubai, Doha, and New York.

In July 2009, Norris joined the Board of Xinuos.

References
http://www.gdsi.co/page63.html

Further reading

Federal Retirement Thrift Investment Board
Private equity and venture capital investors
The Carlyle Group people
Living people
Year of birth missing (living people)